The New Jersey Commissioner of Public Safety heads one of the departments in those local governments in New Jersey that operate under the Walsh Act form of municipal governance, with oversight over the police and fire departments. This is a standalone position in Walsh Act municipalities with a five-member commission. In those commission forms with three members, this role is combined with the Commissioner of Public Affairs role into a consolidated Commissioner of Public Affairs and Public Safety. 

Frank Hague, the mayor of Jersey City from 1917 to 1947, served as the city's Commissioner of Public Safety for his entire tenure.

Other commissioners
Five-Member Commissions
Commissioner of Public Affairs
Commissioner of Public Works
Commissioner of Parks and Public Property
Commissioner of Revenue and Finance

Three-Member Commissions
Commissioner of Revenue and Finance
Commissioner of Public Works, Parks and Public Property

See also 
 Department of Public Safety

External links
The Commission Form of Municipal Government (PDF)
A History of Municipal Government in New Jersey Since 1798 (PDF)

Local government in New Jersey